Sea Harvest Corporation (Pty) Ltd and Another v Duncan Dock Cold Storage (Pty) Ltd and Another is an important case in South African law, particularly in the area of delict and on the question of negligence.

Facts 
A recently built cold store, owned by the first respondent and erected on land in the Table Bay harbour owned by the second respondent, was set alight by a distress flare fired to celebrate the New Year. The fire destroyed the store and its contents.

Among the contents were goods owned by the first and second appellants, which had been stored in terms of oral contracts of deposit. The main section of the store containing the cold rooms was steel-framed and roofed with two pitches of fibre cement separated by a fibreglass box gutter. The roof was insulated with panels of expanded polystyrene sheathed in aluminium. The cold rooms themselves were constructed of similar panels, although both the polystyrene core and aluminium cladding were thicker. The roof sheets were non-combustible, but the fibreglass guttering, though requiring a "fairly substantial heat source" to ignite, was combustible, as was the polystyrene core of the insulation panels, although the aluminium cladding would provide some initial protection.

Because the port area did not fall within the jurisdiction of the local municipality, plans for buildings required the approval of the port engineer rather than that of the city council. The plans for the cold store facility were, nonetheless, submitted to the council's fire department for comment. The fire department classified the store as "moderate risk storage" and required, in terms of the applicable SA Bureau of Standards code, the installation of a sprinkler system in the roof void and in the store itself. (No sprinkler system would have been required by a "low risk" classification.) At the time, only one or two cold stores in South Africa had sprinkler systems. The same was generally true of cold stores in the United Kingdom and Europe. After discussing the fire department's "requirements" with the project engineer and architect, and then consulting the National Building Regulations and SABS code, the port engineer concluded that the correct classification of the building was "low risk" and that a sprinkler system was accordingly not required. None was therefore installed.

Despite the prohibition against the firing of distress flares in the harbour, other than for the purposes of assistance, it appeared that the firing of flares at midnight on New Year's Eve had been a regular occurrence. There was no evidence that a flare had ever previously caused a fire in the harbour or its surrounding areas. The parties were agreed

 that a distress flare had probably ignited the fibreglass box gutter;
 that this in turn had ignited the expanded polystyrene core of the roof insulation panels; and
 that the fire had then spread to the cold-room roofs and into the cold rooms.

It was common cause that a sprinkler system would either have extinguished the fire or at least have served to control it.

In an action for damages against the respondents, the appellants alleged that the respondents had been negligent in failing to instal a sprinkler system. A Provincial Division dismissed their claims.

Judgment 
In an appeal, the court held (per Scott JA, with Smalberger JA, Howie JA and H Marais JA concurring, and Streicher JA concurring but for different reasons) that the true enquiry was whether, in all the circumstances, the project engineer (who had designed the facility and who, as project-leader, had co-ordinated the work of various professional firms engaged to assist in the project) had been negligent in failing to install a sprinkler system, and whether the port engineer's failure to insist upon its installation had been both wrongful and negligent.

Whether what had been labelled as the relative theory of negligence (articulated in Mukheiber v Raath) or what had been labelled as the absolute or abstract theory of negligence (articulated in Kruger v Coetzee) was adopted, it should not be overlooked that, ultimately, the true criterion for determining negligence was whether, in the particular circumstances, the conduct complained of fell short of the standard of the reasonable person.

Whichever formula were adopted, the court held that there should always be a measure of flexibility to accommodate "grey area" cases: The need for various limitations to the broadness of the enquiry where circumstances so demanded had long been acknowledged. It had thus been recognised that, while the precise or exact manner in which the harm had occurred need not have been foreseeable, the general manner of its occurrence had to have been reasonably foreseeable.

There could be no doubt that, as a general possibility a fire in the cold store had reasonably been foreseeable; indeed, fire extinguishers and hose reels had been installed at various places within the building to guard against that eventuality. It was also true that the causes of fire were varied and many. It was nonetheless axiomatic that what was reasonably foreseeable had necessarily to be confined to those fires, whatever their cause, which fell within the parameters of reasonable possibility. What would, typically, have been reasonably foreseeable in this instance would have been the possibility of a fire starting somewhere in the building itself. What had actually occurred had been something entirely different. Simply to equate it, for the purposes of determining culpability, with just any fire could have the effect of attributing culpability for damage resulting from a danger which in truth had not been foreseeable as a reasonable possibility.

Having regard to the circumstances of the case, the court held that the question of culpability had to be determined not simply by asking whether a fire, any fire, had been foreseeable but whether a reasonable person in the position of the project engineer or the port engineer would have foreseen the danger of fire emanating from an external source on the roof of the building with sufficient intensity to ignite the gutter.

Given that the building was relatively isolated in relation to other buildings in the harbour area, there was nothing about its locality rendering it more vulnerable to fire. The region, furthermore, was not prone to lightning of the kind which would set fire to buildings. Save for a burning flare, it was difficult to conceive of any other source of fire which could have set the roof alight from above.

Bearing in mind that distress flares had been designed to burn out at a height of not less than 150 feet and that, notwithstanding the long-standing practice of firing off flares to celebrate the New Year, there had never been a fire caused in that fashion, the court held that, even if the project engineer and port engineer had known of the practice (which, they testified, they had not), the possibility of a flare landing while still burning and setting fire to the gutter of a building constructed with an otherwise non-combustible shell was so remote as not to have been reasonably foreseeable.

The court held, accordingly, that the evidence had established that the danger of fire emanating from an external source on the roof of the building with sufficient intensity to ignite the gutter had not been reasonably foreseeable; or, expressed differently, that a reasonable person in the position of the project engineer and port engineer would not have foreseen the danger as real enough to warrant precautionary measures. The appeal was accordingly dismissed and the decision in the Cape Provincial Division, in Sea Harvest Corporation (Pty) Ltd and Another v Duncan Dock Cold Storage (Pty) Ltd and Another, confirmed.

Further reading:

See also 
 Delict
 Law of South Africa
 South African law of delict

References

Case law 
 Mukheiber v Raath and Another 1999 (3) SA 1065 (SCA).
 Kruger v Coetzee 1966 (2) SA 428 (A).
 Sea Harvest Corporation (Pty) Ltd and Another v Duncan Dock Cold Storage (Pty) Ltd and Another 2000 (1) SA 827 (SCA).

Notes 

Supreme Court of Appeal of South Africa cases
1999 in South African law
1999 in case law
South African delict case law